Dark Latin Groove (DLG) is a salsa band that mixes salsa, reggae and hip-hop. The group was brought together in New York by producer Sergio George (who also signed them to his record company Sir George Records) and included Huey Dunbar, Fragancia, and James "Da Barba" de Jesus.

Beginnings
Looking for vocalists, Sergio George discovered within the salsa club scenes both Huey Dunbar and James "Da Barba" de Jesus. De Jesus had previously been a backup singer for both Tito Nieves and Sistah Souljah. Their first appearance took place in April 1996 when they performed alongside Sergio George, who took up keyboard.

Breakup
After their third album in 2000, lead singer Huey Dunbar decided to break away from DLG to pursue a solo career. This essentially led to an anticipated breakup of the entire group. James DaBarba and Fragrancia formed a new DLG with a new female member.

Rebirth 
In 2007, DLG producer Sergio George announced that the group would resurface again. Dunbar rejected George's invitation to return to the group. Sergio's search for a new vocalist led him to "Miss YaYa", whose real name is Yahaira Vargas. She had previously participated in an American-Idol-like contest called 'Gigantes del Mañana' on the variety show Sabado Gigante in 2000. In addition, YaYa was on the first season of Sean P. Diddy Combs show Making the Band 3 in 2005 on MTV. Her manager contacted Sergio who reviewed her work and photos via myspace.com. They set up an interview in Florida with Sergio, and James "Da Barba".

The new DLG, with Miss YaYa and James Da Barba, was nominated for a 2009 Grammy in the "Best Tropical Album" category, and a 2009 Premio Lo Nuestro award for "Best Tropical Group."

After 25 years of making hits; Fragancia, Sergio George reunited for their new album coming soon this 2018. Fragancia takes over DLG with the original rhythm but ready to start a new trending in music, fashion and business, with new singers who bring to this DLG strong and powerful voices, Sebastian Martingaste] and Dorian Planas. 

Coming Soon- Historias Sin Contar, the new Album, hits the streets announcing DLG NEW GENERATION Coming Soon...

Discography

Albums
 1996: Dark Latin Groove
 1997: Swing On
 1999: Gotcha!
 2007: Renacer
 2018: Historias Sin Contar (album)

Compilations
 2000: Greatest Hits
 2000: Grandes Éxitos
 2003: Serie Azul Tropical
 2004: Lo Esencial
 2005: 20 Éxitos Originales
 2010: Mis Favoritas

References

External links

American experimental musical groups
American salsa groups
Musical groups established in 1996